III is the third studio album by Maylene and the Sons of Disaster. It was released June 23, 2009, and all pre-orders shipped on June 18, 2009. The first single from the album is Just A Shock, which was uploaded to the band's MySpace as a promo for the album. About a week before the album's release another song was released to the public: Step Up (I'm On It). On June 19 the album was leaked in its entirety onto the internet. The song "Harvest Moon Hanging" is a reference to the Harvest Moon from the Bone series (most notably collection six, Old Man's Cave). The album debuted at number 71 on the Billboard 200 in its first week of release. It was announced that their song "Step Up (I'm on It)" was used as the official theme for the inaugural WWE Bragging Rights Pay-Per-View. In 2010, was released a Deluxe Edition of the album in iTunes, containing two new songs and the music video for "Step Up (I'm on It)". "Step Up (I'm on It)" also was on Season Two: Episode One of the critically acclaimed series "Sons Of Anarchy", when Bobby came back to the clubhouse after his jail time. "Step Up (I'm on It) is also in the video game EA Sports MMA.

Track listing

Personnel
Maylene and the Sons of Disaster
 Dallas Taylor – lead vocals, banjo, acoustic guitar on "Where the Saints Roam"
 Chad Huff – lead guitar
 Jake Duncan – rhythm guitar, vocals
 Kelly Scott Nunn – rhythm guitar
 Roman Haviland – bass
 Matt Clark – drums, percussion

Additional personnel
 Bethany Borg – violin
 Jacob Bunton – banjo, mandolin, violin, additional vocals
 Tim Carroll – bowed bass
 Billy Grant – harmonica, additional vocals
 Chris Griffin – dobro, lap steel guitar
 Keith Harrison – additional vocals
 Michael Swann – slide guitar
 Barry Waldrep – banjo, lap steel guitar, dobro
 Adam Wright – piano, string arrangements
 Jason Elgin – engineer, production, mixing, percussion, additional vocals
 Roger Lian – mastering

References

2009 albums
03